Mu "Iron Pole" Tiezhu (literally meaning "Mu Iron Pole"; June 1, 1949 – September 14, 2008) was a prominent Chinese basketball player and coach. At a height of 228 cm (7 feet 5.75 inches) and a weight of 160 kg, he was one of the largest and tallest players in China (Yao Ming and Sun Mingming both being similar or taller).

Biography 
Mu was born in Dongming County, Heze, Shandong in 1949.

Mu was one of the first Chinese giants who appeared in the China men's national basketball team. He played for the national basketball team for 14 years. As a member of Bayi Basketball Team, Mu still held the highest score of 81 points in a game, and played against the 1978 NBA champion Washington Bullets twice in August, 1979. Mu retired as a player in 1987, and as a coach in 2000.

He was often  compared with Sun Mingming, because both of them have acromegaly, and could slam dunk without their feet leaving the ground.

Mu Tiezhu died of myocardial infarction on September 14, 2008 in Beijing. Two days after his death, The Draft Review named Mu as an "Honorable Draftee", saying he would have been a very high pick in the 1972 NBA draft had China been a more open society at the time.

Honours
 FIBA Asia Championship: 1977, 1979, 1981, 1983
 Asian Games: 1978
 Asia Club Championship: 1981, 1984

Filmography

Honors 
 Asian Games, champion, 1978
 Asian Basketball Championships, champion, 1979, 1981, 1983

References 

1949 births
2008 deaths
Bayi Rockets players
People with acromegaly
Asian Games medalists in basketball
Basketball players at the 1978 Asian Games
Asian Games gold medalists for China
Chinese men's basketball players
20th-century Chinese male actors
Chinese male film actors
People from Dongming County
Male actors from Shandong
Basketball players from Shandong
Medalists at the 1978 Asian Games
Hui sportspeople